Fernanda Flores Cariola (born 14 September 1993) is a Chilean field hockey player.

Flores has been part of both the Chile junior and senior national teams. She made her junior debut at the 2012 Pan-Am Junior Championship, and her senior debut a year earlier in 2011.

Flores has medalled with the national team at twoSouth American Games, in Santiago in 2014 and Cochabamba in 2018. She also won a historic silver medal with the team at the 2017 Pan American Cup in Lancaster.

References

1993 births
Living people
Chilean female field hockey players
South American Games gold medalists for Chile
South American Games silver medalists for Chile
South American Games bronze medalists for Chile
South American Games medalists in field hockey
Competitors at the 2014 South American Games
Competitors at the 2018 South American Games
Competitors at the 2022 South American Games
Pan American Games competitors for Chile
Field hockey players at the 2019 Pan American Games
20th-century Chilean women
21st-century Chilean women